The Robert D. Green Generating Station is a coal-fired power plant owned and operated by the Big Rivers Electric Cooperation as part of Sebree Station. It is located in the northeast corner of Webster County, Kentucky. It will convert to natural gas in March 2022 sourced from Czar's Pipeline.

Emissions data
2006 CO2 Emissions: 3,923,035 tons
2006 SO2 Emissions:
2006 NOx Emissions:
2005 Mercury Emissions:

See also

Coal mining in Kentucky

References

External links
 Big Rivers website

Energy infrastructure completed in 1979
Coal-fired power plants in Kentucky
Buildings and structures in Webster County, Kentucky